The 2012 Canadian Masters Curling Championships were held from March 26 to April 1 at the Club de curling Boucherville and the Club de curling Saint-Lambert in Boucherville and Saint-Lambert, Quebec.

The games played were split between the two venues; the games listed on sheets A through C were played at the Club de curling Boucherville, and the games listed on sheets D through G were played at the Club de curling Saint-Lambert.

Men

Teams
The teams are listed as follows:

Round-robin standings
Final round-robin standings

Round-robin results
All times listed in Eastern Standard Time (UTC-5).

Draw 1
Monday, March 26, 13:30

Draw 2
Monday, March 26, 20:00

Draw 4
Tuesday, March 27, 12:00

Tuesday, March 27, 13:00

Draw 6
Tuesday, March 27, 19:00

Tuesday, March 27, 20:00

Draw 7
Wednesday, March 28, 9:00

Wednesday, March 28, 10:00

Draw 9
Wednesday, March 28, 19:00

Wednesday, March 28, 19:30

Draw 11
Thursday, March 29, 13:00

Thursday, March 29, 14:00

Draw 13
Friday, March 30, 8:30

Draw 15
Friday, March 30, 15:30

Crossovers

A3 vs. B3
Saturday, March 31, 14:00

A4 vs. B4
Saturday, March 31, 14:00

A5 vs. B5
Saturday, March 31, 14:00

A6 vs. B6
Saturday, March 31, 9:00

Playoffs

Semifinals
Saturday, March 31, 14:00

Bronze-medal game
Sunday, April 1, 9:30

Final
Sunday, April 1, 14:00

Women

Teams
The teams are listed as follows:

Round-robin standings
Final round-robin standings

Round-robin results
All times listed in Eastern Standard Time (UTC-5).

Draw 1
Monday, March 26, 14:30

Draw 2
Monday, March 26, 20:00

Draw 3
Tuesday, March 27, 8:30

Tuesday, March 27, 9:30

Draw 5
Tuesday, March 27, 15:30

Tuesday, March 27, 16:30

Draw 8
Wednesday, March 28, 13:00

Wednesday, March 28, 14:00

Draw 10
Thursday, March 29, 9:00

Thursday, March 29, 10:00

Draw 12
Thursday, March 29, 19:00

Thursday, March 29, 19:30

Draw 14
Friday, March 30, 12:00

Draw 16
Friday, March 30, 19:00

Draw 17
Saturday, March 31, 9:00

Playoffs

Semifinals
Saturday, March 31, 14:00

Bronze-medal game
Sunday, April 1, 9:30

Final
Sunday, April 1, 14:00

References

External links
Home Page

2012 in Canadian curling
Boucherville
Saint-Lambert, Quebec
2012 in Quebec
Curling competitions in Quebec